Kcee Or KCEE may refer to:

Kcee (musician) (born 1979), Nigerian recording artist 
KCEE, an American radio station